"The Bridge Washed Out" is a 1965 single by Warner Mack. "The Bridge Washed Out" was Mack's fourth release to hit the U.S. country singles chart and his only number one. The song spent a single week at the top and a total of 22 weeks on the chart.

Chart performance

References
 

1965 singles
Warner Mack songs
Song recordings produced by Owen Bradley
1965 songs
Decca Records singles